Pascal Schmidt is a German footballer who plays as an attacking midfielder for Rot Weiss Ahlen.

References

External links
 
 Pascal Schmidt at Fupa

1992 births
Living people
German footballers
Association football midfielders
Arminia Bielefeld players
Rot Weiss Ahlen players
FC Schalke 04 II players
Sportfreunde Lotte players
KFC Uerdingen 05 players
Hammer SpVg players
3. Liga players
People from Unna
Sportspeople from Arnsberg (region)
Footballers from North Rhine-Westphalia